International Journal of Legal Medicine is a peer-reviewed scientific journal aims to improve the scientific resources which are used in the elucidation of crime and forensic applications. It was founded in Germany in 1990 and is the official journal of the International Academy of Legal Medicine. The journal is published by Springer Science+Business Media, as of 2022 editors in chiefs are Heidi Pfeiffer and Andreas Schmeling.

Abstracting and indexing 
The journal is abstracted and indexed in:

 ANVUR
 BFI List
 BIOSIS
 Biological Abstracts
 CNKI
 CNPIEC

According to the Journal Citation Reports, the journal has a 2021 impact factor of 2.686.

References

External links 

 

English-language journals
Publications with year of establishment missing
Springer Science+Business Media academic journals